Corythoxestis cyanolampra is a moth of the family Gracillariidae. It is known from South Africa.

The larvae feed on Burchellia bubalina. They mine the leaves of their host plant. The mine has the form of an extremely long, narrow, irregularly contorted, purely epidermal gallery on the upper side of the leaf.

References

Endemic moths of South Africa
Phyllocnistinae
Moths of Africa
Moths described in 1961